Wenlock is a rural locality in the Shire of Cook, Queensland, Australia. In the  Wenlock had a population of 3 people.

Geography
There are 3 sections of the Batavia National Park in the north-east, east, and south-west of the locality.

History 
In the  Wenlock had a population of 3 people.

References 

Shire of Cook
Localities in Queensland